An interrobang  is a typographic symbol.

The word interrobang may also refer to 
 Interrobang (album), an album by American rock band Bayside 
 Interrobang (Switchfoot album), an album by American rock band Switchfoot

See also

 Interrabang, an Italian film
 Interbang, an Italian television series